Ben Andrew Clymer (born April 11, 1978) is an American former professional ice hockey defenseman who played in the National Hockey League with the Tampa Bay Lightning and Washington Capitals. He also played college hockey at the University of Minnesota.

Playing career
Clymer was drafted 27th overall in the 1997 NHL Entry Draft by the Boston Bruins. He attended and played hockey for Bloomington Jefferson High School and the University of Minnesota. Clymer left school in 1998 to take advantage of a loophole in the NHL CBA which would allow him to become an unrestricted free agent if he was to play one year in the WHL.  In this pursuit he joined the Seattle Thunderbirds of the Western Hockey League in 1998–1999 in played 70 games posting 56 points.

Clymer made his NHL debut with the Tampa Bay Lightning the following season (1999), and was part of the 2004 Stanley Cup Championship team. During the NHL lockout, Clymer played with Swiss team EHC Biel in the second Swiss division.

After the lockout, Clymer returned to the NHL, signing a one-year contract with the Washington Capitals on August 8, 2005. The following year he was re-signed to a three-year contract, however spent the final year of his contract in the AHL with the Hershey Bears.

For the 2008–09 season, Clymer left the NHL and signed with the Minsk of the KHL.  That season Clymer was named an All-Star and played in the KHL's All-Star game outdoor in Moscow's Red Square.  Clymer scored a goal and was a member of the victorious "Team Jagr". Following that season Clymer signed a one-year contract with ERC Ingolstadt.

An integral part of Ingolstadt's defense during the 2009–10 season, Clymer scored 32 points in 37 games before he was again on the move within Europe, signing with HC Lugano of the Swiss Nationalliga A.

Clymer, failed to appear for Lugano in a NLA after suffering a season ending knee injury in training camp. He then returned to Ingolstadt on a one-year contract on May 14, 2011. However, unable to satisfactorily recover from his lingering knee injury, Clymer announced his retirement just over a month later on June 30, 2011.

Post career 
Following Clymer's retirement, Clymer enrolled back at the University of Minnesota, and was admitted to the Carlson School of Management where he received a degree in Finance. During his retirement Clymer also broke into the broadcast world.  In 2009 Clymer was hired by Channel 45 to cover the Minnesota State High School Hockey Tournament. Clymer has continued to annually cover the State High School Tournament for Channel 45 and has also been hired by Fox Sports North to cover Minnesota Golden Gopher and Minnesota Wild games. On September 16, 2013 it was announced that Clymer had joined the Big Ten Network as a college hockey analyst.

Career statistics

Regular season and playoffs

International

Awards and honors

Personal life 
Clymer has a degree in Finance. He is married.

References

External links

1978 births
American men's ice hockey defensemen
Boston Bruins draft picks
EHC Biel players
HC Dinamo Minsk players
Hershey Bears players
Ice hockey players from Minnesota
Sportspeople from Bloomington, Minnesota
ERC Ingolstadt players
Living people
Minnesota Golden Gophers men's ice hockey players
Rochester Mustangs players
Seattle Thunderbirds players
Stanley Cup champions
Tampa Bay Lightning players
Washington Capitals players